Morris Odell Mason (March 28, 1954 – June 25, 1985) was a convicted rapist and murderer who called himself "the killer for the Eastern Shore".

Early life
Mason was born in Philadelphia and was raised by his mother in Northampton County, Virginia. He struggled in academics and never completed high school. Mason also joined the U.S. Army during the Vietnam War.

Crimes
He was convicted of rape, murder, and arson in the murder of 71-year-old Margaret K. Hand in Northampton County, Virginia on May 13, 1978. Mason nailed his victim's wrist into the seat of a chair and bound her with rope into that chair before burning her home down. Mason also confessed to raping and murdering 86-year-old Ursula Stevenson on May 2, 1978, as well as raping and sodomizing a 12-year-old girl and shooting her 13-year-old sister, who became a paraplegic as a result, on May 14, 1978.

Attorneys for Mason contended that their client was mentally retarded and did not comprehend his crimes, thus warranting the commutation of his death sentence by Governor Chuck Robb. Robb rejected their appeals after having read internal memos stating that several psychiatric analyses of Mason done by the state during his life of crime showed that Mason had a low IQ but understood his actions. In particular, after killing Hand, Mason took steps to avoid implicating himself by returning to the burning house to recover a bag with his identity papers in it.

Mason's last meal consisted of four Big Macs, two large orders of french fries, two ice cream sundae, a piece of hot apple pie, and two large grape sodas, which he shared with two guards. He had no last words.

See also
 Capital punishment in Virginia
 Capital punishment in the United States
 List of people executed in Virginia

General references
 The Associated Press. Two Men Convicted Of Murder Are Executed In Virginia And Texas. The New York Times (1985-06-26). Retrieved on 2007-08-13.
 Helen Redmond. Executions Banned For Mentally Retarded. The New Abolitionist (August 2002, Issue 25). Retrieved on 2007-08-13.
 US Executions since 1976. Clark County Prosecutor. Retrieved on 2007-08-13.
 Human Rights Watch. Beyond Reason: Defendants with Mental Retardation: Their Stories. Retrieved on 2008-04-01.

References

1954 births
1985 deaths
American people executed for murder
20th-century executions by Virginia
People executed by Virginia by electric chair
20th-century executions of American people
People convicted of murder by Virginia
American spree killers
Executed spree killers
United States Army personnel of the Vietnam War